Cataetyx alleni, sometimes called Allen's brotula, is a species of fish in the family Bythitidae (viviparous brotulas).

Description

It has 109–111 dorsal finrays, 79–83 anal finrays, and 31–32 pectoral finrays.

Habitat

Behaviour
Cataetyx alleni reproduces viviparously. It feeds on polychaetes and benthic crustaceans.

References

Bythitidae
Fish described in 1906